William David Charles Carling   (born 12 December 1965) is an English former rugby union player. He was England's youngest captain, aged 22, and won 72 caps from 1988 to 1996, captaining England 59 times. Under his captaincy, England won Five Nations Grand Slam in 1991, 1992 and 1995, and reached the 1991 World Cup final.

He played for Rosslyn Park and Harlequins at club level. In the 1992 New Year Honours, he was appointed an Officer of the Order of the British Empire (OBE).

Since retiring, Carling has pursued interests including corporate speaking and punditry. In 2018 he joined the England coaching staff of Eddie Jones as a leadership mentor.

Early life
The son of Lieutenant Colonel Bill Carling, an officer in the Royal Regiment of Wales, Carling was born in Bradford-on-Avon and educated at Terra Nova School in Cheshire and then Sedbergh School, on an army scholarship. He disliked being sent to prep school but showed an aptitude for rugby and played above his age group, arriving at Sedbergh – a "big rugby school" – with a reputation as a serious talent.

On 2 April 1983 he made his debut for England Schools in a 16–0 victory over Ireland. He narrowly missed out on a junior Grand Slam, with an England Schools side that included Kevin Simms, Victor Ubogu and Carling's future Durham and Harlequins teammate Andy Mullins, losing 13–12 to Wales.

University
Having decided for a career in the British Army like his father, Carling – after a gap year – took an in-service degree in Psychology at Durham University. This meant the "occasional weekend exercise", but otherwise military activities were rather limited. He was an undergraduate student at Hatfield College, Durham (which had built a strong sporting reputation post-war), and was reunited with Mullins. Carling did not enjoy the transition from school to university rugby, and claimed to have "stagnated" in terms of development. Playing his first year at fullback, he had to accept a style of rugby that offered less creative freedom than he was used to.

 

Carling strongly considered giving up rugby after failing to enjoy his first year on the pitch at Durham, but found himself rejuvenated during an old boys' match at Sedbergh; and this reignited a desire to succeed in the sport. By his own admission did not take his studies seriously and was often absent for lectures. He left with an ordinary pass degree in 1988. In January that year, Carling, still an undergraduate, made his debut for England against  at the Parc des Princes. In May he was invited to tour with England abroad, but the start date clashed with his final exams. Consequently, he took his exams two days early, and to safeguard examination security, was driven straight to Newcastle Airport.

Despite a less than stellar academic record, Carling had the opportunity to continue his education at the University of Cambridge and represent Cambridge University R.U.F.C., who had already recruited his Durham colleague Chris Oti. However, Carling did not follow up the invitation, because he did not feel he would have got in on merit.

Career

Early career, 1987–1991
The England rugby team were in a period of transition following failure at the 1987 Rugby World Cup. There was a new manager, Geoff Cooke, and a new coach, Roger Uttley, replacing Mike Weston and Martin Green. England's recent record was one of considerable underachievement, described by one writer as a "sprawling desert of failure, stretching back as far as 1963" — they had only won a single Five Nations Championship since then, in 1980. The new season offered good prospects for younger players, as league rugby was introduced for the first time, establishing a "proper system which rewarded progress"; Divisional Championships, which brought the best club players into regional teams, would not necessarily be the main method of selection in future.

In February 1987 Carling made his debut for Harlequins against Metropolitan Police. He soon played for England B in a 22–9 win over France B.  Carling sensed he had a chance of earning his first senior England cap when Kevin Simms, a former England Schoolboys teammate, was selected to play against Romania. As Carling knew the strengths and weaknesses of Sims and "wasn't in awe of him", expectation that he might match this achievement grew.

Around Christmas 1987 Carling took part in an England trial for the upcoming Five Nations Championship. Initially he and Simms were set to be part of a junior team set to test more experienced "probables" including Simon Halliday of Bath and John Buckton of Saracens; but both Halliday and Buckton pulled hamstrings, which saw Carling and Simms "bumped up". The team list was officially published the following Monday, and after some uncertainty, Carling realised he'd earned his first callup when a university friend phoned to congratulate him. His debut against France on 16 January was a defeat, with England losing 10-9 in Paris due to a late French score. Later comparing the atmosphere in the dressing room afterwards to a "morgue", Carling was nonetheless pleased with his own performance. Carling started the remaining games against Wales, Scotland and Ireland, with England winning the latter two to finish third in that years Five Nations Championship. 

Though still expected to pursue a military career, Carling abandoned these plans. He has stated that, contrary to media suggestions, he was never "fully commissioned". By Carling's own account, he was due to attend Sandhurst for the full officer training course in August 1988, but his status as an England international meant the army would not be able to accommodate his rugby ambitions. As a result, Carling opted to "buy himself out" of the army for £8,000. As rugby was an amateur game at this point, he accepted an executive post with Mobil Oil to make ends meet.

1991–1995
Under Carling England started to challenge and beat the established rugby union powers such as New Zealand and Australia, and their success helped to make rugby union a more popular sport in England. English victories over New Zealand and South Africa in 1993 were perhaps the peak of England's performance under Carling.

Carling's career included the 1993 British Lions tour to New Zealand. He underachieved on that tour, a pattern attributed by coach Ian McGeechan and manager Geoff Cooke as at least partly due to his failing to secure the captaincy (this instead going to Gavin Hastings of Scotland) but also due in large part to the ascendency in the centre of both Guscott and Scott Gibbs of Wales. McGeechan and Cooke disclosed that Carling came close to voluntarily withdrawing from the squad; he did however recover his test place and played a notable role in the third test. McGeechan commented in his autobiography that Carling's failure to rise to the occasion as a Lion (in contrast to Guscott) may be seen by some as the difference between his legacy as a good player and a great player.

He had earlier led England to wins against Australia in November 1988, and South Africa in November 1992. As captain, he had 2 wins against Australia, 1 against New Zealand, and 2 against South Africa.

1995 World Cup
In the run-up to the 1995 World Cup, after England returned to form with their third Grand Slam in five years, Carling described the Rugby Football Union general committee as "57 old farts" which led to his sacking as captain. The incident had been provoked by administrator Dudley Wood's comments about England players' alleged desire to cheat by breaking the amateur ethic. He was however quickly reinstated due to public pressure and following a public apology was able to go to the 1995 Rugby World Cup. After a slow start, England found form and subsequently won all their group games knocking out Australia in the quarter final 25–22, thanks to a last-minute drop-goal from Rob Andrew. They were well beaten by New Zealand in the semi-final, largely thanks to four tries from Jonah Lomu. Although Carling himself scored two tries towards the end of that game, and set up two more for Rory Underwood, England lost 45–29. The subsequent loss in the third place play-off, against France, was England's first loss to the French in seven years.

Following his resignation from the England captaincy, he continued to be selected as an outside centre, usually with Guscott or Phil de Glanville; the latter succeeded him as captain.

Life after rugby
After his rugby career ended he became a TV pundit on rugby union. He has also worked as a motivational speaker and in 2001 founded Will Carling Management Ltd, a corporate hospitality company which is also involved in the rugby social networking website 'Rucku'.

George Gregan, an Australian player, equalled Carling's then world record 59 matches as captain in the 2007 Rugby World Cup against Fiji. In the 2009 Tri Nations Series, Springbok John Smit also equalled and then beat Carling's record in tests between New Zealand in Bloemfontein, and Durban respectively. Brian O'Driscoll Ireland/Lions 2009 and 2010, and Richie McCaw broke his record in 2011.

Personal life
Carling is married to his second wife Lisa, the ex-wife of David Cooke. The couple have two children. Carling has an older son with former partner Ali Cockayne. Carling was previously married to the television presenter Julia Carling (née Smith) from 1994 to 1996. Prior to their divorce, he was romantically linked by some members of the press with Diana, Princess of Wales, the then-wife of Prince Charles. Carling has denied any such relationship.

Carling, whose mother was diagnosed with breast cancer when he was an infant and later died from the disease, is a patron of the charity Breakthrough Breast Cancer.

Politics
In August 2014, Carling was one of 200 public figures who were signatories to a letter to The Guardian opposing Scottish independence in the run-up to September's referendum on that issue.

Matches as captain

Honours as captain
Rugby World Cup
Runner-up: 1991

Five Nations Championship
Champions: 1991 (Grand Slam and Triple Crown), 1992 (Grand Slam and Triple Crown), 1995 (Grand Slam and Triple Crown), 1996 (Triple Crown)
Runners-up: 1989, 1990, 1994

Calcutta Cup
Winners: 1989, 1991–96
Runners-up: 1990

Millennium Trophy
Winners: 1989–92, 1995–96
Runners-up: 1993–94

Honours 
In 2021, World Rugby inducted Carling into its World Rugby Hall of Fame, alongside Osea Kolinisau, Humphrey Kayange, Huriana Manuel, Cheryl McAfee and Jim Telfer.

Notes

References

External links 
Sporting Heroes       
 Lions profile
 Englands forgotten hero - bbc.co.uk

1965 births
Living people
Alumni of Hatfield College, Durham
Barbarian F.C. players
British & Irish Lions rugby union players from England
Combined Services rugby union players
Durham University RFC players
England international rugby union players
English rugby union players
Harlequin F.C. players
Officers of the Order of the British Empire
People educated at Sedbergh School
Royal Regiment of Wales officers
Rugby union centres
Rugby union players from Wiltshire